Dentergem is a municipality, located in the Belgian province of West Flanders. The municipality comprises the towns of Dentergem proper, Markegem, Oeselgem and Wakken. On January 1, 2006, Dentergem had a total population of 8,188. The total area is 25.94 km2 which gives a population density of 316 inhabitants per km2.

References

External links 

Official website - Available only in Dutch

 
Municipalities of West Flanders